Tapinoma geei is a species of ant in the genus Tapinoma. Described by William Morton Wheeler in 1927, the species is endemic to China and South Korea.

References

Tapinoma
Hymenoptera of Asia
Insects described in 1927